Chimene Mary "Chemmy" Crawford-Alcott ( Alcott; born 10 July 1982) is an English former World Cup alpine ski racer. She competed in all five disciplines: downhill, super G, giant slalom, slalom and combined.

Alcott competed in four Winter Olympic Games and seven FIS World Championships and has been overall Senior British National Champion 7 times (1999, 2002, 2003, 2005, 2007, 2008, 2009) and Overall British Ladies Champion 8 times. She retired from international competition following the 2014 season.

Early life 
Born in Hove, East Sussex, England, Alcott was named after Sophia Loren's character in the 1961 film El Cid. She started skiing at 18 months old on a family holiday in Flaine, France, and first raced at the age of three.

In 1993, Alcott won the Etoile D'Or French Village Ski Championship, became a member of the British Junior Alpine team in 1994 and won the 1995 Sunday Times Junior Sportswoman of the Year award. Every British summer from the age of 11 to 19 Alcott travelled to New Zealand to train in the winter.

She was a talented athlete, representing Richmond in dry slope skiing, and in tennis at the London Youth Games. She was inducted into the London Youth Games Hall of Fame in 2011.

Aged 11, Alcott broke her neck in a skiing accident, recovering with two vertebrae fused together. She still carries X-rays of the injury so that if she is ever in an accident, the hospital will know not to prise the vertebrae apart.

Career 
Alcott made her FIS race debut in August 1997 in a Giant Slalom event at Coronet Peak, New Zealand. By the end of the 1997/1998 season, she had made her debuts in both the FIS Junior World Championships (Chamonix) and the British National Championships (Tignes), where she won a Silver medal in the Giant Slalom.

She returned to the Australia/New Zealand Cup in 1998, during the European summer winning the overall championship. The following winter Alcott won Silver (super G) and Bronze (giant slalom) medals at the 1999 European Youth Olympics in Štrbské Pleso, Slovakia. In December 1999, Alcott made her World Cup debut in a giant slalom race in Lienz, Austria. The winter of 1999 also saw her crowned World Schools Champion, before adding the World Artificial and Australian Overall Championships to her name in 2000.

At the 2001 Junior World Championships, Alcott finished 8th in the slalom event on her way to 5th in the overall classification. This season also saw Alcott capture the 2001 British Junior title and the Senior British super G title in Saalbach-Hinterglemm, Austria.

2002 and the Salt Lake City Winter Games 
At 19 years of age, Alcott was ranked in the Top 10 in the world for her age group, while also rising from 683rd to 126th in the downhill rankings over the course of the season.

Her Olympic debut followed in Salt Lake City, Utah. She competed in all of the Alpine disciplines with a best result of 14th position in the combined event.

Later in the season, Alcott returned to the Junior World Championships, finishing in 4th place based on overall championship points (ahead of Lindsey Vonn). In her final British Junior Championships, Alcott won all the titles on offer. She also won British Senior tiles in the Giant Slalom, Super G and Downhill – claiming the Overall Senior crown for the first time.

2003 
In March 2003, Alcott scored her first World Cup points by finishing 27th in a GS event in Innsbruck, Austria.

At the British National Championships in Tignes, France, Alcott won the slalom title for the first time on her way to a clean sweep of all the discipline titles.

2004 
Throughout the 2004 World Cup season, Alcott consistently finished in the top-30, including an 11th-place finish in the Lake Louise super G – less than 1.5 seconds behind Renate Goetschl's winning time.

In January 2004, Alcott achieved her first top-10 result, a 9th-place finish in the Cortina downhill. It was the best result by a British woman for more than 30 years, after Gina Hathorn's 9th-place finish in a Slalom at Heavenly Valley in March 1972.

However, a knee ligament injury meant that Alcott was unable to defend her British titles.

2005 
At the 2005 World Championships (Santa Caterina, Italy), Alcott finished 19th in the Downhill, 22nd in the Super G and 35th in the Giant Slalom.

At the British National Championships (Meribel, France), Alcott again won the Downhill, Super G, and Slalom), also winning the Victrix Ludorum trophy for the Overall Championship for the third time.

2006 and the Torino Winter Games 
The Torino Winter Olympic Games saw Alcott finish 11th in the downhill, the best Olympic performance by a British female skier since 1968. Alcott was however disqualified from the combined event following the first run of the slalom, where her skis were found to be 0.2 mm narrower than the FIS regulations allowed. She recorded 19th and 22nd-place finishes in the super G and giant slalom events, respectively.

In the World Cup, Alcott achieved seven top-30 results, with a best finish of 12th place in the super G at Bad Kleinkirchheim, Austria.

In a weather-disrupted British Championships (Meribel, France), Alcott won the slalom and giant slalom titles. The super G was cancelled due to adverse weather conditions, as was the Senior downhill. However, it was decided to award the Senior downhill title using the results of the previous day's Junior race, in which Alcott did not compete. This meant that Katrina Head pipped her to the Overall British title, ending Alcott's stranglehold on the Victrix Ludorum trophy.

Post-Torino and 2007 
A few weeks after the Olympics, Alcott's mother Eve died suddenly, and consequently Alcott decided to take some time away from the sport.

During her break from racing, Alcott underwent surgery on her feet to remove the bunionettes that had been troubling her for years. Alcott's recovery period was extended by two months to five months following a fall during rehabilitation where she re-broke her left foot.

Alcott began the 2007 season with two 13th-place finishes in the first two downhills of the season at Lake Louise and an 11th-place finish in the super G at the Canadian resort. This was followed by a 7th-place finish in the next event in Reiteralm, Austria, in a Super Combined competition, the best result of her career to date. Alcott also finished 9th in the Tarvisio Downhill and had four top-20 results in Giant Slalom, qualifying Alcott for her first World Cup Finals (Lenzerheide, Switzerland), where she placed 15th in the Giant Slalom.

At the British Alpine Championships in Meribel, Alcott won all four titles on offer: the downhill, super G, giant slalom, and slalom events.

2008 
Alcott had a relatively poor 2008 World Cup season, except for 16th and 17th-place finishes in the downhill and super combined events at St. Anton and a 16th-place finish in the GS race in Maribor, Slovenia.

At the British Championships in Meribel, France, Alcott won the downhill, super G, giant slalom, and slalom titles. She also finished second to 19-year-old Louise Thomas in the super combined. The Championships also saw Alcott take the Overall title for the fifth time.

2009 
Alcott finished 10th in the opening giant slalom of the season in Sölden, Austria. However, she broke her ankle during training for the next race in Canada, resulting in three months on the sidelines. On her return to action, Alcott finished 15th in the GS at Cortina d'Ampezzo, Italy, and then 21st in the super G at Garmisch the following weekend.

At the 2009 World Championships, Alcott finished 21st in the super G. In the following event, the super combined, Alcott had to restart her downhill run after approximately one minute due to a fall by the previous competitor, Frida Hansdotter. On her re-reun, she finished 13th on her way to 19th overall. In the actual Downhill race, Alcott finished 15th, whilst she finished 29th in the giant slalom – the result of a fall during the second run.

Alcott won all five races at the British National Championships (Meribel, France), downhill, super-G, giant slalom, slalom, and super combined titles.

2011 
Alcott sustained a double fracture of her right leg when she crashed training for the World Cup downhill race at Lake Louise, Canada, on 2 December 2010, and consequently missed the entire 2011 skiing season.

2012 
In Winter/Spring 2012, Alcott competed in ITV1's Dancing on Ice alongside professional skater Sean Rice. They finished fifth place in the competition and were eliminated on 11 March 2012.

2018 
Alcott promotes a Brighton-based school travel company.

In February, Alcott beat Graham Bell in a head-to-head slalom race filmed for BBC's Ski Sunday. In November Chemmy Alcott was interviewed by The Telegraph about her views on the gender gap in skiing and why so few women go skiing.

Broadcasting 
During her injury lay-off at the start of the 2009 World Cup season, Alcott joined Matt Chilton in the British Eurosport commentary box as guest commentator for several of the women's World Cup events.

Alcott has previously appeared on Channel 4's World Cup Skiing programme, with a regular feature called Fit to Ski, in which she demonstrated different exercise techniques.

In January 2012 it was announced that Alcott would take part in the ITV programme Dancing on Ice. There was some concern that this would put at risk her rehabilitation from the fractured leg she sustained in December 2010.

In 2018 she was part of the BBC's team providing coverage on the 2018 Winter Olympics.

Personal life 
In June 2008, Alcott climbed Mount Kilimanjaro along with fellow ski racers Julia Mancuso and Laurenne Ross, and Alcott's then boyfriend Mark Weaver. The climb raised  for international humanitarian organisation Right to Play.

As of January 2009, she lives in Hampton Court, England. Chemmy is also a motor sport fan; has an MSA Competition Licence and competed in the 2012 Silverstone Classic Celebrity Challenge race.

In October 2013, the BBC reported that Alcott was to marry her current boyfriend, and fellow alpine ski racer, Dougie Crawford. They married in 2014; she now uses the name Chemmy Crawford-Alcott.

Results

World Cup Top-10 finishes

World Cup Season standings 

Source:

Major championships

Junior World championships

Other achievements 
 London Youth Games
 Hall of Fame member (Class of 2011)

CDC Performance 
CDC Performance, or just CDC (Chemmie Duggie Crawford) is an alpine ski team for mainly children which hosts ski camps for many different races.

References

External links 
 
 
 
 Chemmy Alcott's BOA Profile
 
 Chemmy Alcott's SnowsportGB Profile
 A Chemmy Alcott fan bio website
 Chemmy Alcott – Maximuscle Ambassador Profile

1982 births
Living people
People from Hove
English female alpine skiers
Alpine skiers at the 2002 Winter Olympics
Alpine skiers at the 2006 Winter Olympics
Alpine skiers at the 2010 Winter Olympics
Alpine skiers at the 2014 Winter Olympics
Olympic alpine skiers of Great Britain
People educated at Newland House School
People educated at Surbiton High School
Sportspeople from West Sussex
Skiing announcers